The Sony Xperia M5 is a water & dust resistant high-range Android smartphone manufactured by Sony serving as the successor to the Xperia M4 Aqua. The phone was unveiled on 3 August 2015 along with the Xperia C5 Ultra. The phone is marketed as a “super mid-range” phone, which is between its predecessor, the M4 Aqua, and the flagship, the Xperia Z5

Like its predecessor, the Xperia M4 Aqua, the Xperia M5 is waterproof and dustproof, and has an IP rating of IP65 and IP68. The key highlight of the phone is the 21.5 megapixel  rear camera and ISO 3200 along with 0.25 second Hybrid Autofocus that utilizes phase detection autofocus.

Specifications

Hardware
The Xperia M5 features a 5.0 inch (130 mm) 1080p display. It is dust and water proof with an IP rating of IP65 and IP68 and is powered by the 2.0 GHz octa-core MediaTek HelioX10  MT6795 processor which is backed by 3 GBs of RAM. The M5 includes a non-removable 2600 mAh battery. The rear camera of the M5 is 21.5 megapixel with a Sony Exmor RS image sensor along with ISO 3200 and f/2.2 aperture. The devices also features hybrid autofocus that utilizes phase detection autofocus and contrast detection autofocus that can focus the object within 0.25 seconds. The device comes with 16 GB internal storage along with microSDXC card expansion up to 200 GB.

Software
The Xperia M5 comes preinstalled with Android 5.0 along with Sony's custom UI and software. Sony made an update to Android 6.0 available for the handset.

Sales
The dual-sim variant of the Xperia M5 was launched in India and Hong Kong on 9 September 2015. Sony also announced in early 2016 to sell the M5 in the UK despite originally planning not to sell in UK

Issues
The handset occasionally suffers from automatic shutoff and cannot be restarted or turned on unless connected to a power source via a USB cable. Sony has commented on the issues and has confirmed that most of their first batch of this phone that was released had issues and were faulty and that customers with affected handsets were able to have them repaired by replacing the faulty battery with a new one at a Sony Service Center.

Reception
The Xperia M5 was generally well received. Sony was praised for the handset's improved camera, longer battery life and more generous internal storage

References

External links
Xperia M5 White Paper
Official Press Release

Android (operating system) devices
Sony smartphones
Mobile phones introduced in 2015